Lepidocaryum is a monotypic genus of flowering plant in the palm family from South America where the lone species, Lepidocaryum tenue, is commonly called poktamui. Nine species names have been published, but palm taxonomists currently agree that just one variable species includes them all. The most reduced member of the Lepidocaryeae, it is similar in appearance to three closely related genera, Mauritia, Mauritiella, and Lytocaryum. The genus name combines the Greek words for "scale" and "nut" and the species epithet is Latin for "thin".

Description
At just 2.5 cm in width, the clustering trunks reach no higher than 3.5 m and are covered at the top by old, adherent leaf bases. The small, reduplicate leaves are palmate and borne on 60 cm petioles. Each leaf is split in half, to the petiole, with each half further divided into 2–11 narrow segments.

Lepidocaryum is dioecious, with male and female flowers on separate plants, both with interfoliar inflorescences, branched to two orders, which are superficially similar. Female plants produce oblong or ovoid fruit, usually with one seed, red to brown in color and covered in scales.

Distribution and habitat
Spread throughout Brazil's Amazon region, north to Venezuela, the wetter parts of Colombia, Guyana and Peru, it is an undergrowth palm found in low land rain forest. In habitat the leaves are often used in thatch.

Varieties
Three varieties are recognized:
 Lepidocaryum tenue var. casiquiarense (Spruce) A.J.Hend. - Venezuela, Colombia, Brazil
 Lepidocaryum tenue var. gracile (Mart.) A.J.Hend. - Guyana, northern Brazil
 Lepidocaryum tenue var. tenue - Colombia, Peru, northern Brazil

Uses
In the Amazonian region of Peru, particularly in and around Iquitos, the palm's leaves are widely used for thatching roofs.

References

External links
Lepidocaryum on NPGS/GRIN
Fairchild Guide to Palms: Lepidocaryum
GBIF portal
Plantsystematics.org with images
PACSOA

Calamoideae
Monotypic Arecaceae genera
Flora of the Amazon
Flora of South America
Dioecious plants